Salvador Eugénio Soares dos Reis Pires is an East Timorese politician. Between June 2018 and March 2022, he was the Minister of Public Works, serving under the VIII Constitutional Government of East Timor.

References

External links 

Government ministers of East Timor
Independent politicians in East Timor
Living people
Year of birth missing (living people)

21st-century East Timorese politicians